Lingyuan is a subdistrict of Jinjiang, Fujian, People's Republic of China. It has a population of 25,500,

It has 10 communities:
Lingshui
Zenglin
Dashanhou
Dabulin
Xiaobulin
Linkou
Zhangqian
Yingtang
Linge
Xiaowutang

References

Township-level divisions of Fujian
Jinjiang, Fujian